Dolichopus urbanus is a European species of flies in family Dolichopodidae.

References

urbanus
Diptera of Europe
Insects described in 1824
Taxa named by Johann Wilhelm Meigen